"Stockholm" is a 1992 single released by Orup also appearing on his album Stockholm & andra ställen the same year.

Music video 

In the music video, Orup travels by taxicab. The video contains Stockholm landmarks such as Kristallvertikalaccent and Svampen.

Charts

References 

1992 singles
1992 songs
Number-one singles in Sweden
Orup songs
Songs about Stockholm
Music videos shot in Stockholm
Music videos showing Stockholm